Valiantsina Shyts (born 1 November 1994) is a Belarusian cross-country skier. She made her Paralympic debut during the 2014 Winter Paralympics and took part in the cross-country skiing events.

Shyts won three medals at the 2021 World Para Snow Sports Championships held in Lillehammer, Norway. She won the silver medal in the women's 1km and 7.5km sitting events. She also won the bronze medal in the women's long-distance sitting event. Belarus also won the bronze medal in the 2.5 km mixed relay team event.

References 

1994 births
Living people
Belarusian female cross-country skiers
Cross-country skiers at the 2014 Winter Paralympics
Paralympic cross-country skiers of Belarus
21st-century Belarusian women